Tell Fara may refer to:

 The site of Shuruppak, an ancient Sumerian city
 Tell el-Farah (South), an archeological site associated with the Philistines